Eben is a name of Hebrew origin. It is sometimes short for Ebenezer.

The name can refer to:

People

Given name
 Eben Alexander (educator) (1851–1910), American educator
 Eben Alexander (author) (born 1953), American author and neurosurgeon
 Eben Alexander Jr (1913–2004), American neurosurgeon
 Eben Barnard (born 1992), South African rugby union player
 Eben Bartlett (1912–1983), New Hampshire state representative
 Eben Edwards Beardsley (1808-1892), American Episcopal clergyman
 Eben Burgoon (born 1979), American author, cartoonist, and artist
 Eben Byers (1880–1932), American socialite, golfer and industrialist who died from drinking radioactive "medicine"
 Eben Pomeroy Colton (1829-1895), American businessman, farmer and politician, Lieutenant Governor of Vermont
 Eben Britton (born 1987), American former National Football League player
 Theophilus Ebenhaezer Eben Dönges (1898–1968), South African politician
 Eben Sumner Draper (1858–1914), American businessman and politician, 41st Governor of Massachusetts
 Ebenezer Eben Dugbatey (born 1973), Ghanaian retired footballer
 Eben Emerson, American lighthouse keeper who rescued the crew of a brig in 1865
 Eben Etzebeth (born 1991), South African rugby player
 Eben Fardd, bardic name of Ebenezer Thomas (1802-1863), Welsh poet
 Eben Ernest Hayes (1851-1933), New Zealand engineer and inventor
 Eben Norton Horsford (1818-1893), American scientist known for his reformulation of baking powder
 Eben Samuel Johnson (1866-1939), English-American bishop of the Methodist Episcopal Church
 Eben Joubert (born 1983), South African rugby union player
 Eben Jenks Loomis (1828-1912), American astronomer
 Eben Martin (1855–1932), American politician
 Eben Matlis (1923–2015), mathematician
 Eben Moglen (born 1959), American law professor
 Eben Newton (1795-1885), American politician
 Eben Fiske Ostby (born 1955), film animator, one of the first four Pixar employees
 Eben E. Rexford (1848-1916), American writer, poet and lyricist
 Eben Ezra Roberts (1866-1843), American architect
 Eben William Robertson (1815–1874), British historian
 Eben Smith (1832-1906), American businessman
 Eben S. Stearns (1819–1887), American educator
 Eben F. Stone (1822-1895), American politician
 Eben Swift (1854–1938), American major general
 Eben Upton (born 1978), Welsh Raspberry Pi Foundation co-founder
 Ebenezer Eben van Zijl (1931-2009), politician and lawyer in South West Africa (now Namibia)
 Eben Gowrie Waterhouse (1881-1977), Australian language teacher and Germanist and plant breeder 
 Eben Wilson (1869-1948), American college football player and head coach

Surname
 Baron Eben (17731825), Prussian military officer active in the Peninsular War
 Johannes von Eben (1855–1924), Prussian World War I general
 Mike Eben (born 1946), American former football player in the Canadian Football League
 Petr Eben (1929–2007), Czech composer, organist and choirmaster

, Czech musicians,  sons of Petr Egen:
, (born 1957), Czech musician and musicologist
, (born 1957), Czech  scientist and musician
 Marek Eben (born 1957), Czech actor, singer, composer, writer and television host

Fictional characters
 Eben Adams, in the movie Portrait of Jennie
Eben Cabot, protagonist of the 1924 play Desire Under the Elms
 Eben Flood, the main character in Edwin Arlington Robinson's poem "Mr. Flood's Party"
 Eben Holden, protagonist of the 1900 novel of the same name
Eben Hopwil, character in Robert Jordan's The Wheel of Time
 Eben Kent, Golden Age name of Jonathan Kent, adoptive father of Superman / Clark Kent
 Eben Olemaun, protagonist of the horror comic book miniseries 30 Days of Night

See also 

 Quatuor Ébène, a French string quartet ensemble
Eban (name)

Masculine given names
Hypocorisms